Al-Washash is a neighborhood of Baghdad, Iraq.  Located within Mansour district, surrounded by Iskan from west, Al-Mutanabi from south, Al-Mothana Airport from east.

Washash